Jiřího z Poděbrad is a Prague Metro station on Line A, located in Vinohrady, Prague 3. In January 2023 it closed for reconstruction.

General information
The station was named after the eponymous square it lies under, which was named after George of Poděbrady. Jiřího z Poděbrad is an underground trispan station. The main materials used on walls and ceilings are anodized aluminium, marble and granite. The only exit leads to an underground vestibule, which is connected with the platform by escalator tunnel. The station was opened on 19 December 1980 as part of the extension of the line between Náměstí Míru and Želivského.

In January 2023 the station closed to undergo a year-long reconstruction, with trains passing through without stopping. The reconstruction will involve replacing the escalators and installing new lifts for step-free access.

In popular culture

At the beginning of the Radiohead song "A Reminder," the female voice of the Metro's automated announcement system can be heard announcing this station. It is also used in the song "Mind the Gap" by Calexico.

Gallery

References

External links 

 Gallery and information 

Prague Metro stations
Railway stations opened in 1980
1980 establishments in Czechoslovakia
George of Poděbrady
Prague 3
Railway stations in the Czech Republic opened in the 20th century